Time in Nepal is officially represented by Nepal Standard Time (NPT, UTC+05:45).

IANA time zone database
The IANA time zone database contains one zone for Nepal in the file zone.tab, named Asia/Kathmandu.

References